Habitat for Humanity GTA, established in 1988, is a non-profit, non-denominational Christian housing organization that builds simple, decent, affordable homes in partnership with low-income families. Habitat Toronto is an affiliate of Habitat for Humanity Canada.

History
Habitat for Humanity Toronto was a local grassroots organization from its founding in 1988 to 2000. Every couple of years the organization built one or two homes thanks to a small group of dedicated volunteers and corporate donors.

In 2001 Habitat Toronto increased its building capacity by completing 6 homes in only 9 days on Luttrell Ave in Toronto's east end. Construction of those homes began with a ground breaking ceremony led by the co-founder of Habitat for Humanity, Millard Fuller.   Building on the momentum from that build in 2002 the organization partnered with World Youth Day to build a home at Downsview Airport that would be blessed by Pope John Paul II.  The home was later moved to Lovilla Blvd.

In 2009, over 80 homes were built at three different build sites, due to the generosity of committed volunteers and donors.

In 2014 Habitat Toronto, Habitat Brampton, and Habitat York merged to form Habitat GTA. On April 1, 2020, Habitat for Humanity Durham amalgamated with Habitat GTA.

Habitat GTA does not cover Mississauga, Halton, or Dufferin, as Mississauga, Halton, and Dufferin are covered by Habitat for Humanity Halton-Mississauga-Dufferin.

Mission

Vision 
A world where everyone has a safe and decent place to live.

Mission Statement
To mobilize volunteers and community partners in building affordable housing and promoting homeownership as a means of breaking the cycle of poverty.

Values
Housing for all
Human dignity
Partnership
Faith in action 
Diversity and Inclusiveness

Building and Homeownership
Habitat homes are built through funding from individual donors and corporate sponsors. Volunteers are the key to keeping costs down and building safe and decent homes. "In 2008 11,000 volunteers donated over 84,658 hours of their time and talent to Habitat for Humanity Toronto."

Habitat Toronto has built homes throughout Toronto and recently broke ground on their 200th affordable home.

Homes Built from 2006-2009

Source:

Homeownership
In order to qualify for a Habitat GTA home applicants much go through a rigorous screening process, including police, credit and personal reference checks.

Families must also meet the following criteria:

They must be currently living in unsafe, unhealthy, overcrowded housing

Families must be willing to volunteer 500 hours of "Sweat Equity" towards the construction of their home, a new Habitat community, or other Habitat programs, such as the ReStore. They must also attend a series of workshops on home ownership.

Families must be able to afford a mortgage and not have an overwhelming amount of debt. They must be a legal resident of Canada for at least three years and be able to show a consistent work history for those three years.

Building Green
In 2007-2008 Habitat Toronto successfully built the first official Energy Star certified homes in Canadian Habitat History.

In 2009, the organization broke ground on Canada's first solar-paneled homes built by Habitat for Humanity at the Williams Way Build Site. The homes being built here are expected to be upwards of 25% more efficient than the Ontario Building Code Standards. This will help reduce the cost of energy paid by the low-income families moving in. Habitat homes also include Energy Star certified appliances, further reducing the energy used by the homes.

Habitat GTA ReStores
The 10 ReStores in Brampton, Caledon, Toronto and York Region are owned and operated by Habitat for Humanity GTA. The ReStores sell new and gently used renovation supplies and materials at discounted prices. These materials come via donation from homeowners and local businesses. Money raised from the sale of items at the ReStores pays for the administrative and fundraising costs of Habitat for Humanity Toronto. This allows 100% of donations to Habitat for Humanity Toronto to go directly towards building homes for families living in need.

ReStores also conduct salvages, where a group of volunteers travel to homes and disassemble kitchens and other units and transport them to the ReStores. The ReStores help redirect large amounts of materials from landfills to homebuilders and renovators.

The ReStores grossed $2.5 million in 2009 while redirecting 1,497 metric tons of reusable construction materials from landfills.

Habitat GTA Business Model
Money raised from the sale of items at the Habitat Toronto ReStores pays for the administrative and fundraising costs of Habitat for Humanity GTA. This allows 100% of donations to Habitat for Humanity Toronto to go directly towards building homes for families living in need. The average cost for a Habitat GTA home is between $100,000 and $120,000. Mortgage payments from Habitat GTA homeowners go directly into a trust to build more Habitat homes. The Habitat model empowers families to help other families. For every 12 homes built by Habitat GTA, one additional home per year can be built from the mortgage income alone.

Events
Habitat GTA holds many special events during the year at build sites and other venues. These events can be a special build day for a celebration such as Mother's Day Build. Actress and supermodel Monika Schnarre participated in the 2010 Mother's Day Build with her mother.

Each year Habitat GTA holds a "blitz build" that targets a specific group and tries to get a large portion of that group out to build. In 2009, the organization held a Women Build event where 300 female volunteers helped build 16 homes in Scarborough.

Habitat GTA also holds an Annual Gingerbread Build in December where children are able to build gingerbread houses to help raise funds for the building of safe, decent and affordable homes.

Awards
Habitat for Humanity Toronto has been awarded numerous times for their work in the community. They were presented with an Urban Leadership Award for Renewal in 2010. The City of Toronto also honoured the organization in 2010 as an Affordable Housing Champion in Toronto.

Habitat for Humanity Toronto CEO Neil Hetherington was named as one of the Top 40 under 40 by The Caldwell Partners International in 2009.

References

External links
 Habitat for Humanity Toronto Official Website

Non-profit organizations based in Toronto
Greater Toronto Area
Housing organizations